Heikki Kuula (born 27 January 1983) is a Finnish rapper, record producer and graphic designer. He is known for his frequent collaborations with the fellow rapper Pyhimys who has also served as an executive producer on Kuula's albums.

Career beginnings

Heikki Kuula released his first album Hoodipihvii with Voli in 2004, and two years later they teamed up again for Wordcup. That year Kuula also released his first solo album Vihreä salmiakki. His second solo album PLLP arrived in 2008.

Commercial success

Kuula's third solo album Blacksuami was released in May 2010 and was the first to appear on the Official Finnish Album Chart where it reached the position 41. Heikki Kuula started to gain more recognition later that year after he appeared as a featured artist on the song "Epoo", a debut single by the rap duo Jare & VilleGalle. Kuula also appeared on their next single "Nelisilmä" which reached number 17 on the Official Finnish Singles Chart.

In February 2012, Heikki Kuula and Pyhimys released an album Katuvisioita, using the pseudonyms Perhosveitsi-Heikki and Lika-Aki. The album peaked at number nine on the Official Finnish Album Chart.

Teflon Brothers

Heikki Kuula is also a part of the hip hop and rap group Teflon Brothers with Pyhimys and Voli. They have released three albums so far; T (2009), © (2010) and Valkoisten dyynien ratsastajat (2013). The latter has become their most successful release to date, peaking at number six on the Official Finnish Album Chart. The album has also spawned a single "Seksikkäin jäbä", featuring Stig and Meiju Suvas, which reached number three on the Official Finnish Singles Chart.

Discography

Solo albums

Solo singles

Heikki Kuula & Voli

Perhosveitsi-Heikki & Lika-Aki

Teflon Brothers

As a featured artist

References

External links
Official Homepage of Heikki Kuula (as a graphic designer)

Living people
Finnish rappers
Finnish hip hop musicians
1983 births
Finnish hip hop record producers